The Sturmgeschütz III (StuG III) assault gun was Germany's most-produced fully tracked armoured fighting vehicle during World War II, and second-most produced German armored combat vehicle of any type after the Sd.Kfz. 251 half-track. It was built on a slightly modified  Panzer III chassis, replacing the turret with an armored, fixed superstructure mounting a more powerful gun. Initially intended as a mobile assault gun for direct-fire support for infantry, the StuG III was continually modified, and much like the later Jagdpanzer vehicles, was employed as a tank destroyer.

Development
The Sturmgeschütz originated from German experiences in World War I, when it was discovered that, during the offensives on the Western Front, the infantry lacked the means to engage fortifications effectively. The artillery of the time was heavy and not mobile enough to keep up with the advancing infantry to destroy bunkers, pillboxes, and other minor fortifications with direct fire. Although the problem was well known in the German army, it was General Erich von Manstein who is considered the father of the Sturmartillerie (assault artillery). The initial proposal was from von Manstein and submitted to General Ludwig Beck in 1935, suggesting that Sturmartillerie units should be used in a direct-fire support role for infantry divisions. On 15 June 1936, Daimler-Benz AG received an order to develop an armoured infantry support vehicle capable of mounting a  calibre artillery piece. The gun mount's fixed, fully integrated casemate superstructure was to allow a limited traverse of a minimum of 25° and provide overhead protection for the crew. The height of the vehicle was not to exceed that of the average soldier.

Daimler-Benz AG used the chassis and running gear of its recent Panzer III medium tank as a basis for the new vehicle. Prototype manufacture was passed over to Alkett, which produced five prototypes in 1937 on Panzer III Ausf. B chassis. These prototypes featured a mild steel superstructure and a Krupp short-barrelled, howitzer-like in appearance, 7.5 cm StuK 37 L/24 cannon. Production vehicles with this gun were known as Gepanzerte Selbstfahrlafette für Sturmgeschütz 7.5 cm Kanone Ausführung A bis D (Sd.Kfz.142).

While the StuG was considered self-propelled artillery, it was not clear which land combat arm of the German Army would handle the new weapon. The Panzerwaffe (armoured corps), the natural user of tracked fighting vehicles, had no resources to spare for the formation of StuG units and neither did the infantry. It was agreed that it would best be employed as part of the artillery arm. The StuGs were organized into battalions (later renamed "brigades" for disinformation purposes) and followed their own doctrine. Infantry support using direct fire was its intended role. Later, there was also a strong emphasis on its use as an anti-tank gun.

As the StuG was designed to fill an infantry close support combat role, early models were fitted with a howitzer-pattern, low-velocity 7.5 cm StuK 37 L/24 gun, much as the earliest versions of the fully turreted Panzer IV were. Low-velocity shells are lightly built of thin steel and carry a large charge of explosive, to destroy soft-skin targets and blast fortifications. Such shells do not penetrate armour well. After the Germans encountered the Soviet KV-1 and T-34 tanks, the StuG was first equipped with a high-velocity 7.5 cm StuK 40 L/43 main gun (spring 1942) and in the autumn of 1942 with the slightly longer 7.5 cm StuK 40 L/48 gun. These high-velocity guns were the same as those mounted on the Panzer IV for anti-tank use but the heavy steel wall high-velocity shells carried much less explosive and had a lower blast effect for use against infantry or field fortifications. These versions were known as the 7.5 cm Sturmgeschütz 40 Ausf.F, Ausf. F/8 and  Ausf. G (Sd.Kfz.142/1).

Beginning with the StuG III Ausf. G from December 1942, a 7.92 mm MG34 machine gun could be mounted on a shield on top of the superstructure for added anti-infantry protection. Some of the F/8 models were retrofitted with a shield. An additional coaxial 7.92 mm MG34 started to appear in 1944 and became standard on all production during the same year.

The vehicles of the Sturmgeschütz series were cheaper and faster to build than contemporary German tanks; at 82,500 RM, a StuG III Ausf G was cheaper than a Panzer III Ausf. M, which cost 103,163 RM. This was due to the omission of the turret, which greatly simplified manufacture and allowed the chassis to carry a larger gun. By the end of the war, ~11,300 StuG IIIs and StuH 42s had been built.

Operational history

The Sturmgeschütz III-series of vehicles proved very successful and served on all fronts, from Russia to North Africa and Western Europe to Italy, as assault guns and tank destroyers. Because of their low silhouette, StuG IIIs were easy to camouflage and be hidden and were difficult targets to destroy. As of 10 April 1945, there were 1,053 StuG IIIs and 277 StuH 42s in German service. The StuG assault guns were cost-effective compared with the heavier German tanks such as the Tiger I and the Panther, although as anti-tank guns they were best used defensively as the lack of a traversable turret and their generally thin armour was a severe disadvantage in the attack role. As the situation for the German military deteriorated further later in the war, more StuGs were built than tanks, particularly due to ease of production.

In Italy, the Sturmgeschütz was highly-valued by crews fighting Allied armour, but was dogged by mechanical unreliability; particularly the delicate final drive units. The small box on the track cover, which was normally fixed on the engine deck, contained the track tools.

In 1943 and 1944, the Finnish Army received 59 StuG III Ausf. Gs from Germany and used them against the Soviet Union. Thirty of the vehicles were received in 1943 and a further twenty-nine obtained in 1944. The first batch from 1943 destroyed at least eighty-seven enemy tanks for a loss of only eight StuGs (some of which were destroyed by their crews to prevent enemy capture). The later batch from 1944 saw no real action. After the war, the StuGs were the main combat vehicles of the Finnish Army up until the early 1960s when they were phased out. These StuGs gained the nickname "Sturmi" in the Finnish military, which can be found in some plastic scale-model kits.

100 StuG III Ausf. Gs were delivered to Romania in the autumn of 1943. They were officially known as TAs (or TAs T3 to avoid confusion with TAs T4 (Jagdpanzer IVs)) in their army's inventory. By February 1945, 13 were still in use with the 2nd Armoured Regiment. None of this initial batch survived the war. Thirty-one TAs were on the Romanian military's inventory in November 1947. Most of them were probably StuG III Ausf. Gs and a small number of Panzer IV/70 (V) (same as TAs T4). These TAs were supplied by the Red Army or were damaged units repaired by the Romanian Army. All German equipment was removed from service in 1950 and finally scrapped four years later due to the army's decision to use only Soviet armour.

StuG IIIs were also exported to other nations friendly to Germany, including Bulgaria, Hungary, Italy, and Spain. Hungary fielded its StuG IIIs against Soviet forces as they invaded their country in end-1944 up until early 1945. As with Hungary, Bulgaria received several StuGs from Germany too but almost none saw service against the Soviets, the country having ended the alliance with Germany by switching sides to the Allies before the Soviets invaded. Post-WWII, these were used for a short time before being turned into fixed gun emplacements on the Krali Marko Line on the border with neighbouring Turkey. StuG IIIs were also given to the pro-German Ustashe Militia in Yugoslavia, most of which were captured in Yugoslavia by Tito's Yugoslav partisans during and after the war, as did German-operated vehicles. These were used by the Yugoslav People's Army until the 1950s when they were replaced by more modern combat vehicles. Spain received a small number (around 10) of StuG IIIs from Germany during WWII, later sold to Syria between 1950 and 1960. Italy received the smallest number of StuG IIIs Germany distributed in the war, with only 3.

After the Second World War, abandoned German StuG IIIs remained behind in many European nations Germany occupied during the war years, such as in Czechoslovakia, France, Norway and Yugoslavia. The Soviet Union also captured hundreds of ex-German StuGs, most ending up being donated to Syria. An Italian 12.7 mm Breda-SAFAT machine gun taken from Syrian Fiat G.55 was mounted on commander cupola with retrofitted anti-aircraft mount. Syria continued to use StuG IIIs along with other war surplus armoured fighting vehicles received from the USSR or Czechoslovakia (varying from long-barrelled Panzer IVs (late models) and T-34-85s) during the 1950s and up until the War over Water against Israel in the mid-1960s. By the time of the Six-Day War in 1967, many of them had been either destroyed, stripped for spare parts, scrapped or emplaced on the Golan Heights as pillboxes. Some remained in service up to the Yom Kippur War in 1973. None remain in service today. A few Syrian StuG IIIs ended up in Israeli hands and have become war memorials or simply left rusting away on former battlefields.

Variants
Production numbers were:

 StuG III prototypes (1937, 5 produced on Panzer III Ausf. B chassis): by December 1937, two vehicles were in service with Panzer Regiment 1 in Erfurt. Although not suitable for combat, they were used for training purposes as late as 1941.

 StuG III Ausf. A (Sd.Kfz. 142; January–May 1940, 30+6 produced by Daimler-Benz): first used in the Battle of France, the StuG III Ausf. A used a modified 5./ZW chassis (Panzer III Ausf. F) with front armour strengthened to 50 mm. The last six vehicles were built on chassis diverted from Panzer III Ausf. G production.
 StuG III Ausf. B: (Sd.Kfz 142; June 1940–May 1941, 300 produced by Alkett) Modified 7./ZW chassis (Panzer III Ausf. H), widened tracks (380 mm). Two rubber tires on each roadwheel were accordingly widened from 520 × 79 mm to 520 × 95 mm each. Both types of roadwheel were interchangeable. The troublesome 10-speed transmission was changed to a 6-speed one. The forwardmost return rollers were re-positioned further forward, reducing the vertical movements of the tracks before they were fed to the forward drive sprocket, and so reduced the chance of tracks being thrown. In the middle of production of the Ausf. B model, the original drive sprocket with eight round holes was changed to a new cast drive sprocket with six pie slice-shaped slots. This new drive wheel could take either 380 mm tracks or 360 mm wide tracks. 380 mm tracks were not exclusive to new drive wheels, as spacer rings could be added to the older sprockets. Vehicle number 90111 shows the older drive wheel with wider 380 mm tracks.
 StuG III Ausf. C: (Sd.Kfz 142; April 1941, 50 produced) Gunner's forward view port above driver's visor was a shot trap and thus eliminated; instead, superstructure top was given an opening for gunner's periscope. Idler wheel was redesigned.
 StuG III Ausf. D: (Sd.Kfz 142; May–September 1941, 150 produced) Simply a contract extension on Ausf. C. On-board intercom installed, transmission hatch locks added, otherwise identical to Ausf. C.
 StuG III Ausf. E: (Sd.Kfz 142; September 1941February 1942, 284 produced) Superstructure sides added extended rectangular armoured boxes for radio equipment. Increased space allowed room for six additional rounds of ammunition for the main gun (giving a maximum of 50) plus a machine gun. One MG 34 and seven drum-type magazines were carried in the right rear side of the fighting compartment to protect the vehicle from enemy infantry. Vehicle commanders were officially provided with SF14Z stereoscopic scissor periscopes. Stereoscopic scissor type periscopes for artillery spotters may have been used by vehicle commanders from the start.
 StuG III Ausf. F: (Sd.Kfz 142/1; March–September 1942, 366 produced) The first real up-gunning of the StuG, this version uses the longer 7.5 cm StuK 40 L/43 gun. Firing armour-piercing Panzergranat-Patrone 39, the StuK 40 L/43 could penetrate 91 mm of armour inclined 30 degrees from vertical at 500 m, 82 mm at 1,000 m, 72 mm at 1,500 m, 63 mm at 2,000 m, allowing the Ausf. F to engage most Soviet armoured vehicles at normal combat ranges. This change marked the StuG as being more of a tank destroyer than an infantry support vehicle. An exhaust fan was added to the rooftop to evacuate fumes from spent shells, to enable the firing of continuous shots. Additional 30 mm armour plates were welded to the 50 mm frontal armour from June 1942, making the frontal armour 80 mm thick. From June 1942, Ausf. F were mounted with approximately 13 inch (334 mm to be exact) longer 7,5 cm StuK 40 L/48 gun. Firing above mentioned ammunition, longer L/48 could penetrate 96 mm, 85 mm, 74 mm, 64 mm respectively (30 degrees from vertical).
 StuG III Ausf. F/8: (Sd.Kfz 142/1; September–December 1942, 250 produced) Introduction of an improved hull design similar to that used for the Panzer III Ausf. J / L with increased rear armour. This was 8th version of the Panzer III hull, thus the designation "F/8". This hull has towing hook holes extending from side walls. From October 1942, 30 mm thick plates of additional armour were bolted (previously welded) on to speed up the production line. From F/8, the 7.5 cm StuK 40 L/48 gun was standard until the last of the Ausf. G. Due to the lack of double baffle muzzle brakes, a few L/48 guns mounted on F/8s were fitted with the single baffle ball type muzzle brake used on the Panzer IV Ausf. F2/G.
 StuG III Ausf. G (Sd.Kfz. 142/1; December 1942April 1945, ~8,423 produced, 142 built on Panzer III Ausf. M chassis, 173 converted from Panzer III): The final and by far the most common of the StuG series. Upper superstructure was widened: welded boxes on either sides were abandoned. This new superstructure design increased its height to 2160 mm. The back wall of the fighting compartment got straightened, and the ventilation fan on top of the superstructure was relocated to the back of the fighting compartment. From March 1943, the driver's periscope was abandoned. In February 1943, Alkett was joined by MIAG as a second manufacturer. From May 1943, side hull spaced armour plates (Schürzen) were fitted to G models; these were primarily intended for protection against Russian anti-tank rifles, but were also useful against hollow-charge ammunition. Side plates were retro-fitted to some Ausf. F/8 models, as they were to be fitted to all front line StuGs and other tanks by June 1943 in preparation for the battle of Kursk. Mountings for the Schürzen proved to be inadequate, as many were lost in the field. From March 1944, an improved mounting was introduced; as a result, side skirts are seen more often with late model Ausf G. From May 1943, 80 mm thick plates were used for frontal armour instead of two plates of 50 mm + 30 mm. However, a backlog of StuGs with completed 50 mm armour existed. For those, a 30 mm additional armour plate still had to be welded or bolted on until October 1943.

A rotating cupola with periscopes was added for the Ausf G.'s commander. However, from September 1943, the lack of ball bearings (resulting from USAAF bombing of Schweinfurt) forced cupolas to be welded on. Ball bearings were once again installed from August 1944. Shot deflectors for the cupolas were first installed from October 1943 from one factory, to be installed on all StuGs from February 1944. Some vehicles without shot deflectors carried several track pieces wired around the cupola for added protection.

From December 1942, a square machine gun shield for the loader was installed, allowing an MG34 to be factory installed on a StuG for the first time. When stowed this shield folded back, partially overlapping the front half of the loader's hatch cover.  A curved protrusion welded to the backside of the shield pushed the shield forward as the front half of the loader's hatch cover was opened and guided the hatch cover to naturally engage a latch point on the shield thus, supporting the shield in its deployed position without exposing the loader to hostile forward fire. F/8 models had machine gun shields retro-fitted from early 1943. The loader's machine gun shield was later replaced by rotating machine gun mount that could be operated by the loader inside the vehicle sighting through a periscope. In April 1944, 27 of them were being field tested on the Eastern front. Favourable reports led to installation of these "remote" machine gun mounts from the summer of 1944.

From October 1943, G versions were fitted with the Topfblende pot mantlet (often called Saukopf "Pig's head") gun mantlet without a coaxial mount. This cast mantlet, which had a sloped and rounded shape, was more effective at deflecting shots than the original boxy Kastenblende mantlet that had armour varying in thickness from 45 mm to 50 mm. The lack of large castings meant that the trapezoid-shape boxy mantlet was also produced until the very end. Topfblende were fitted almost exclusively to Alkett-produced vehicles. 

A coaxial machine gun was first added to boxy mantlets, from June 1944, and then to cast Topfblende, from October 1944, in the middle of "Topfblende" mantlet production. With the addition of this coaxial machine gun, all StuGs carried two MG 34 machine guns from autumn of 1944. Some previously completed StuGs with a boxy mantlet had a coaxial machine gun hole drilled to retrofit a coaxial machine gun; however, Topfblende produced from November 1943 to October 1944 without a machine gun opening could not be tampered with.  

Also from November 1943 onwards, all-metal return rollers of a few different types were used due to lack of rubber supply. Zimmerit anti-magnetic coating to protect vehicles from magnetic mines was applied starting in September (MIAG facility) or November (Alkett facility) 1943 and ending in September 1944.

Further variants

In 1942, a variant of the StuG Ausf. F was designed with a  true howitzer instead of the 7.5 cm StuK 40 L/43 cannon. These new vehicles, designated StuH 42 (Sturmhaubitze 42, Sd.Kfz 142/2), were designed to provide infantry support with the increased number of StuG III Ausf. F/8 and Ausf. Gs being used in the anti-tank role. The StuH 42 mounted a variant of the 10.5 cm leFH 18 howitzer, modified to be electrically fired and fitted with a muzzle brake. Production models were built on StuG III Ausf. G chassis. The muzzle brake was often omitted due to the scarcity of resources later in the war. Alkett produced 1,299 StuH 42 from March 1943 to 1945, the initial 12 vehicles were built on repaired StuG III Ausf. F and F/8 from the autumn of 1942 to January 1943.

In 1943, 10 StuG IIIs were converted to the StuG III (Flamm) configuration by replacing the main gun with a Schwade flamethrower. These chassis were all refurbished at the depot level and were a variety of pre-Ausf. F models. There are no reports to indicate that any of these were used in combat and all were returned to Ausf. G standard at depot level by 1944.

In late 1941, the StuG chassis was selected to carry the 15 cm sIG 33 heavy infantry gun. These vehicles were known as Sturm-Infanteriegeschütz 33B. Twenty-four were rebuilt on older StuG III chassis of which twelve vehicles saw combat in the Battle of Stalingrad, where they were destroyed or captured. The remaining 12 vehicles were assigned to 23rd Panzer Division.

Due to the dwindling supply of rubber, rubber-saving road wheels were tested during 8–14 November 1942, but did not see production.

Bombing raids on the Alkett factory resulted in significant drops in StuG III production in November 1943. To make up for this loss of production, Krupp displayed a substitution StuG on a Panzer IV chassis to Hitler on 16–17 December 1943. From January 1944 onwards, the StuG IV, based on the Panzer IV chassis and with a slightly modified StuG III superstructure, entered production.

Field modifications were made to increase the vehicle's survivability, resulting in diversity to already numerous variants; cement plastered on front superstructure, older Ausf.C/D retrofitted with a KwK 40 L/48 gun, Ausf.G mounting Panzer IV cupola, a coaxial MG34 through a hole drilled on a boxy mantlet, et cetera.

The Soviet SU-76i self-propelled gun was based on captured StuG III and Panzer III vehicles. In total, Factory #37 in Sverdlovsk manufactured 181 SU-76i plus 20 commander SU-76i for Red Army service by adding an enclosed superstructure and the 76.2 mm S-1 tank gun.

Approximately 10,000 StuG IIIs of various types were produced from 1940 to 1945 by Alkett (~7,500) and from 1943 to 1945 by MIAG (2,586). From April to July 1944, some 173 Panzer III were converted into StuG III Ausf. G. The 1,299 StuH 42 and the 12 conversions from StuG III were solely built by Alkett.

Gallery

Operators

  - Main operator
  - Several hundred supplied by Germany and (postwar) the USSR, referred to as TAs or TAs T-3. All scrapped by 1954.
  - Several supplied by Germany and (postwar) the USSR and all either scrapped or turned into gun emplacements bordering Turkey
  - 30 StuGs, nicknamed "Sturmi", were bought in 1943 and another 29 bought in 1944, all directly from Germany. They were used during the Continuation War against the Soviet Union in 1944.
  - Several captured after the war and either scrapped or sold to Syria. One vehicle is on display in Banská Bystrica, Slovakia.
  - Several captured after the war and briefly operated before being scrapped or sold to Syria
  - 50 given by Germany in 1944
  Kingdom of Italy - 12 received from Germany in 1943 and assigned to 1st Blackshirt Armoured Division "M" 
  - Surrendered German military equipment was used from 1947 to 1951
  - In 1943, Franco's Spain received 10 units and used them until 1954. One Ausf. G remains in drivable condition in the Museo Histórico Militar de Cartagena, Spain
  - one Ausf. D variant received from Denmark in late 1945 and used for trials and testing of anti-tank mines, and one Ausf. G used for spare parts
  - At least 30 obtained from various states including the Soviet Union, France, Spain and Czechoslovakia during the 1950s
  - Several hundred captured vehicles used for testing and modifications, including the SU-76i assault gun and SG-122 self-propelled howitzer, with some others (very few) fielded for frontline use
  - Many captured from Germany and its local allies in the Balkans and used up until the 1950s

Surviving vehicles
In working order

 Jon Phillips Private Armor Collection. StuG III Ausf. D. In working order as of 1 July 2016.
 WJHJ Collection, Belgium. StuG III Ausf. G. in full working order with original HL120 Maybach engine and drivetrain.
 Parola Tank Museum, Finland. One StuG III Ausf. G. in museum area and one in storage.
 Histórico Militar de Cartagena, Spain. One StuG III Ausf. G in museum area.
 Bastogne Barracks, Belgium. One StuG III Ausf. F/8
 American Heritage Museum, USA. One StuG III Ausf. G
 Schweizerisches Militärmuseum Full, Switzerland, 1 Ausf. G.
 Deutsches Panzermuseum, Munster, Germany. One Ausf. G
 The Weald Foundation, UK. Two Ausf. G. One was built by MIAG.
 WTD 41, Germany. One Ausf. G.
 The Artillery, Engineer and Signals Museum of Finland, One Ausf. G.
 Patriot Park, Kubinka, Russia. One StuH 42.
More or less intact, but not in working order
 Musée des Blindés, Saumur France. Two StuG IIIs, a StuG III Ausf. G and a StuH 42.
 The Australian Armour and Artillery Museum  Two StuG III's - Ausf A (the only remaining Ausf A), Ausf G, and Ausf. F.
 Kubinka Tank Museum, Russia. Ausf.G
 Yad La-Shiryon Tank Museum, Israel. One StuG III Ausf. G.
 Belgrade Military Museum, Serbia. One StuG III Ausf. F/8.
 The Wheatcroft Collection Four Ausf. G (2 being restored).
 The Tank Museum, Bovington Camp, UK. Two Ausf. G, one is a Finnish StuG III with Zimmerit, concrete armour, and logs for unditching.
 Parola Tank Museum, Finland. Two StuG III Ausf. G in museum area and three in storage. One cut open so public can see interior. Also 16 in various locations around Finland.
 Museum of the Great Patriotic War, Moscow, Russia. Ausf.G
 Museum of Slovak National Uprising, Banská Bystrica, Slovakia. Stug III Ausf. G, late production variant.
 Arsenalen Tank Museum, Strängnäs, Sweden. One StuG III Ausf. D.
 Bundeswehr Military History Museum (Militärhistorisches Museum der Bundeswehr), Dresden, Germany. One StuG III Ausf. G.
 National Museum of Military History, Sofia, Bulgaria. Two Ausf. G
 Parque y Centro de Mantenimiento de Sistemas Acorazados (PCMASA) nº 2 Segovia, Spain, 1 Ausf. G
 Brigada de Infantería Acorazada "Guadarrama" XII (BRIAC XII), Spain, 1 Ausf. G.
 Brigada de Caballería “CASTILLEJOS II”, Spain, 1 Ausf. G.
 Estonian Military Museum, Estonia, Tallinn. StuG III Ausf. G.
 Overloon War Museum, Overloon, Netherlands. One StuG III Ausf. G.
 Memorial to the Heroes of Volokolamsk Who Died During the Second World War, Moscow Oblast, Russia. One Ausf. D.
 Patriot Park, Kubinka, Russia. One Ausf. F/8 and Two Ausf. G (One is a wreck).
 Forsvarsmuseet Oslo Storage, Trandum, Norway. One Ausf. G.
 Steve Lamonby Collection, UK. One Ausf. G.
 Tey Vehicle Restorations, UK. One Ausf. G.
 WTD 91, Germany. One Ausf. G.
 Motor Technica Museum, Bad Oeynhausen, Germany. One Ausf. E.
 Auto + Technik Museum, Sinsheim, Germany. One Ausf. G.
 Artillerie Schule, Idar Obenstein, Germany. One Ausf. G.
 War Museum for Peace "Diego de Henriquez", Trieste, Italy. One Ausf. G.
 Castiglion Fiorentino, Italy. One Ausf. G.
 MUMA. Museum of Tanks, Madrid, Spain. One Ausf. G.
 General Military Academy, Zaragoza, Spain. One Ausf. G.
 Finnish Armoured Brigade's Garrison, Parola, Finland. Three Ausf G.
 Military Museum of Manège, Helsinki, Finland. One Ausf. G.
 Savon Prikaati Garrison, Mikkeli, Finland. One Ausf. G.
 Hiukkavaara Garrison, Oulu, Finland. One Ausf. G.
 Maasotakoulu, Lappeenranta, Finland. One Ausf. G.
 Hamina, Finland. One Ausf. G.
 Kuljetusvarikko, Tampere, Finland. One Ausf. G.
 Karelia Brigade, Vekaranjarvi, Finland. One Ausf. G.
 Panssarivarikko, Ilveskallio, Finland. One Ausf. G.
 Säkylä Winter War and Continuation War Museum, Finland. One Ausf. G.
 Sovintovaara, Finland. One Ausf. G.
 SdKfz Team Poland, One Ausf. G.
 Stalin Line Museum, Minsk Voblast, Bulgaria. One Ausf. G superstructure and main gun.
 Museum Of Combat Glory, Yambol, Bulgaria. One Ausf. G.
 Khmeimim Air Base, Near Lattaquie, Syria. One Ausf. G.
 The Royal Tank Museum, Jordan. One Ausf. G.
 Muzey Tekhniki Vadima Zadorozhnogo, Moscow Oblast, Russia. Three Ausf. G.
 Museum Of Military Equipment "Battle Glory Of The Urals", Sverdlovsk Oblast, Russia. One Ausf. G.
 Saratov, Saratov Oblast, Russia. One Ausf. G.
 U.S. Army Armor & Cavalry Collection, Georgia, USA. Two Ausf. G.
 Patton Museum Of Cavalry And Armor, Kansas, USA. One Ausf. G.
StuH 42s

 Musée Des Blindés, Saumur, France.
 Australian Armour And Artillery Museum, Cairns, Australia.
 U.S. Army Armor & Cavalry Collection, Georgia, USA. Two late production versions.
 US Army Artillery Museum, Oklahoma, USA.
 White Eagle Museum, Skarżysko-Kamienna, Poland. One wreck.

See also
 Sturmgeschütz IV
 Panzerjäger
 Tank destroyer

Tanks of comparable role, performance and era
 American M10 GMC
 German Hetzer, StuG IV and Jagdpanzer IV
 Italian Semovente da 75/34 and Semovente da 75/46
 Romanian Mareșal
 Soviet SU-85

References

Sources
 Peter Mueller, Wolfgang Zimmermann: Sturmgeschütz III - Backbone of the German Infantry History Facts
 Walter J. Spielberger. Sturmgeschütz & Its variants - Schiffer Publishing - 
 
 Military Intelligence Service. Artillery in the Desert (Special Series #6, MIS 416). Department of War, Washington, DC. 25 November 1942. Artillery in the Desert

External links

 Sturmgeschutz III Photos of the Sturmgeschutz III at the Canada War Museum in Ottawa, Canada
 AFV Database
 OnWar model specifications: A  B  D  E  F  G 
 Surviving Sturmgeschütz III and Sturmhaubitze 42 tanks - A PDF file presenting the Sturmgeschütz III and Sturmhaubitze 42 tanks still existing in the world
 StuG III Ausf.F/8 in Kubinka tank museum 

World War II assault guns
World War II tank destroyers of Germany
Military vehicles introduced from 1940 to 1944
Tanks introduced in 1940